The 1990 Wayne County Airport runway collision involved the collision of two Northwest Airlines jetliners at Detroit Metropolitan Wayne County Airport on December 3, 1990. Flight 1482, a scheduled Douglas DC-9-14 operating from Detroit to Pittsburgh International Airport, taxied by mistake onto an active runway in dense fog and was hit by a departing Boeing 727 operating as Flight 299 to Memphis International Airport. One member of the crew and seven passengers of the DC-9 were killed.

Accident
Northwest Airlines Flight 1482, a Douglas DC-9-14, was cleared from the gate toward Runway 03C, but it missed turning onto Taxiway Oscar6 and instead entered the outer taxiway. To correct the error, the crew was instructed to turn right onto Taxiway X-ray, but they instead turned onto the active runway, 03C. They realized the mistake and contacted air traffic control, which instructed them to leave the runway immediately.

Five seconds later (at 13:45 EST), the crew saw the Boeing 727, Northwest Flight 299 to Memphis, heading toward them on its takeoff roll. The 727's wing cut through the right side of the DC-9's fuselage just below the windows, then continued aft, finally cutting off the DC-9's right side (#2) engine. The DC-9 caught fire and was destroyed.

The captain of the DC-9 escaped from the aircraft through the left sliding window. Eighteen people escaped the plane from the left overwing exit, 13 people escaped through the left main boarding door and four people jumped from the right service door. The rear jumpseat flight attendant and a passenger died from smoke inhalation in the DC-9's tail cone; the tail cone release was not activated. Later, an investigation determined that the release mechanism was mechanically inoperable.

Of the surviving passengers, the NTSB stated that 10 received serious injuries and 23 received minor or no injuries. The three surviving crew members received minor or no injuries. The NTSB added that it did not receive medical records for three passengers who were admitted to a burn center; for purposes of the report, the NTSB labeled their injuries as serious. The NTSB also did not receive medical records for the copilot and six passengers who were treated and released from area hospitals; for the purposes of the report, the NTSB assumed that they had received minor injuries.

After the collision, the 727 flight crew immediately initiated a rejected takeoff and was able to stop the aircraft safely on the remaining runway. The captain then shut down all three engines and ascertained that no one on board had been injured and that the aircraft was only lightly damaged. Deciding that no immediate danger existed, he did not order an emergency evacuation, and the passengers and crew deplaned using the rear airstair after the aircraft was sprayed with fire retardant foam as a precaution. The 727 sustained a damaged wing and was later repaired.

Aircraft and crew
The Douglas DC-9 operating Flight 1482, registered N3313L, was built in 1966 and had a total of 62,253 operating hours. The plane was delivered new to Delta, which sold it to Southern Airways in 1973. It became part of Northwest's fleet after the 1986 acquisition of Southern's successor, Republic Airlines. It was declared a total loss and scrapped following this incident. The crew consisted of Captain William Lovelace (52), who had 23,000 flight hours with 4,000 hours in the DC-9, and First Officer James Schifferns (43), who had 4,685 flight hours with 185 hours in the DC-9.

The Boeing 727 operating Flight 299 was registered N278US and had been purchased by Northwest in 1975. It had 37,310 operating hours. The aircraft was repaired and continued in service for Northwest until 1995. N278US was flown by Kitty Hawk Aircargo before being scrapped in 2011. The crew consisted of Captain Robert Ouellette (42), who had 10,400 flight hours with 5,400 hours on the 727, First Officer William Hagedorn (37), who had 5,400 flight hours with 2,350 hours on the 727, and Flight Engineer Darren Owen (31), who had 3,300 flight hours with 900 hours on the 727.

Investigation
The accident was investigated by the National Transportation Safety Board, which determined the probable cause of the accident to be:

In popular culture
The accident is featured in the fourth episode of Season 15 of Mayday, also known as Air Crash Investigation. The episode is titled "Taxiway Turmoil.". As of 2023, this episode is available on Paramount Plus.

See also

 Tenerife airport disaster – 1977 runway incursion in dense fog involving two Boeing 747s, which is the deadliest accident in aviation history 
 Madrid runway disaster – 1983 fatal takeoff accident also involving a DC-9 taxiing incorrectly in dense fog and being struck by a 727 taking off
 Air Canada Flight 759 - 2017 near miss involving an Airbus A320-211 nearly landing on a taxiway occupied by four aircraft
 Los Angeles runway disaster – 1991 fatal accident in which a Boeing 737 landed on a runway occupied by a Fairchild Metroliner
 Linate Airport disaster - 2001 fatal accident in which a Cessna Citation CJ2 taxied in front of a McDonnell Douglas MD-87 taking off in dense fog
 1983 Anchorage runway collision - a nonfatal accident in which a McDonnell Douglas DC-10 attempted to take off from partway down a runway occupied by a Piper PA-31 in dense fog
TWA Flight 427
United Express Flight 5925

References

External links

Aviation accidents and incidents in the United States in 1990
Airliner accidents and incidents in Michigan
Accidents and incidents involving the Boeing 727
Accidents and incidents involving the McDonnell Douglas DC-9
Airliner accidents and incidents caused by weather
Runway incursions
Northwest Airlines accidents and incidents
Wayne County, Michigan
1990 in Michigan
Airliner accidents and incidents involving ground collisions
December 1990 events in the United States
Airliner accidents and incidents caused by pilot error
Aviation accidents and incidents caused by air traffic controller error
Airliner accidents and incidents involving fog
Detroit Metropolitan Airport